Euryphura ducarmei is a butterfly in the family Nymphalidae. It is found in the Democratic Republic of the Congo. The habitat consists of forests.

References

Butterflies described in 1990
Limenitidinae